Visual Imagination Ltd. was a British company that produced genre magazines. It was founded in 1985 by Stephen Payne and originally only published the science-fiction magazine Fantasy Image.

After Payne bought the magazine Starburst from Marvel UK, its list of titles expanded to include:

 Cult Times
 Film Review
 Movie Idols
 Shivers
 Space Junkk
 TV Zone
 Ultimate DVD
 The Works
 XPosé

It also published translated editions of some of the above in France and Germany. The company was disestablished in early 2009.

External links

1985 establishments in the United Kingdom
2009 disestablishments in the United Kingdom
Publishing companies established in 1985
Companies disestablished in 2009
Publishing companies of the United Kingdom